The Betna River is located in Bangladesh. It originates in Jessore District, flows through Satkhira and Khulna, changes its name to Kalia River, and forms a branch called Dalua River. The Kalia flows into the Kobadak River. The Betna changes its name to the Arpangachhia River when it reaches the Sundarbans, and then changes name again to the Malancha River before flowing into the Bay of Bengal.

References

Rivers of Bangladesh
Rivers of Khulna Division